Timo Kunert (born 12 March 1987 in Gladbeck) is a German footballer who currently plays for FSV Frankfurt.

Career
Kunert began his career 1992 with VfB Kirchhellen and joined than 1999 to Schalke 04, who has played seven years in the youth, before promoted to first team in January 2006.

He made his debut in the Bundesliga on 7 April 2007 for Schalke 04, when he came on as a substitute for Mesut Özil in the 90th minute of a game against Borussia Mönchengladbach. Kunert left FC Schalke 04 then after eight years in summer 2007 and signed with Hamburger SV. After two years with Hamburger SV he returned to Nordrhein-Westfalen and signed for Sportfreunde Lotte in summer 2009. On 14 April 2009, he had a trial at Rot-Weiß Oberhausen.

Honours
 Bundesliga runner-up: 2006–07

Early life
Kunert attended the Gesamtschule Berger Feld.

References

External links
 
 

1987 births
Living people
People from Gladbeck
Sportspeople from Münster (region)
German footballers
Germany youth international footballers
Bundesliga players
3. Liga players
Regionalliga players
FC Schalke 04 players
FC Schalke 04 II players
Hamburger SV players
Hamburger SV II players
Sportfreunde Lotte players
Rot-Weiß Oberhausen players
VfL Osnabrück players
1. FC Saarbrücken players
TSV Steinbach Haiger players
FSV Frankfurt players
Association football midfielders
People educated at the Gesamtschule Berger Feld
Footballers from North Rhine-Westphalia